Khawaja Jehanzeb Sadiq, commonly known as Jahanzeb Khan (12 May 1953 – December 2020) was a Pakistani first-class cricketer who played sixty first-class cricket and twenty List A cricket matches for different teams between 1974/75 and 1987/88.

He was educated at Aisha Bawany School.

References

1953 births
2020 deaths
Pakistani cricketers
National Bank of Pakistan cricketers
Karachi Blues cricketers
Sindh cricketers
People from Karachi